The Suicide File was an American hardcore punk band from Boston that formed in April 2001. The band wrote songs with a mostly political message, although many songs also dealt with social and personal problems. Most of the band's output was released on the Southern California-based hardcore label Indecision Records. The band reunited in June 2006 to embark on their first European Tour. Members of the bands are or have been affiliated with The Hope Conspiracy, Death By Stereo, When Tigers Fight, Adamantium, Give Up the Ghost/American Nightmare, Clouds, Panic and many more. Most of these are bands with whom Alexander has drummed for short periods of time.  Dave Weinberg was also known for his frequent collaborations and duets with Julie Ecker and James "Boom Boom" Auclair (cf. unpublished correspondence with the artists). Despite their short tenure, The Suicide File continues to be revered within the hardcore punk community for their musical output and lasting impression on the flourishing Boston hardcore scene. The band since 2006 has played a small number of successfully sized reunion sets.

Members
Dave Weinberg - vocals
Neeraj Kane - guitar
Jarrod Alexander - drums
Jason Correia - guitar
John Carpenter - bass
Jimmy Carroll - guitar on Things Fall Apart 7-inch
Michael Chung - Guest Producer

Discography

Albums
Twilight (Indecision Records, 2003) - CD/LP

EPs / Singles
The Suicide File 7-inch/CDEP (2002) (Indecision Records, 2001/2002) - EP/CDEP
The Suicide File / The Hope Conspiracy split 7-inch (Deathwish Inc., 2002) - EP
The Suicide File / R'N'R split 7-inch (This Blessing, This Curse Recordings, 2002) - EP
Things Fall Apart 7-inch (Indecision Records, 2003) - EP
Live On WERS 7-inch (Lifeline Records, 2004) - EP

Compilation
Some Mistakes You Never Stop Paying For (included demo and split-only releases) (Indecision Records, 2005) - CD/LP

Demos
"The Suicide File" demo tape (Self Released, 2001)

External links
 The Suicide File on Indecision Records

Hardcore punk groups from Massachusetts
Musical groups from Boston
Musical groups established in 2001
Musical groups disestablished in 2003
Deathwish Inc. artists